Singrauli is a city in Singrauli district in the Indian state of Madhya Pradesh and Commissionaire of Rewa. It was also the capital of erstwhile princely state of Singrauli.

Demographics

Child population (0-6) in urban region was 30,079. Average literacy rate in Singrauli was 75.51%.

Notable People
 Nuzhat Parveen, Indian Cricketer

Administration
Singrauli Municipal Corporation is the local body governing the city, and is the second richest municipal corporation in Madhya Pradesh. Rani Agrawal is the mayor of the city. Singrauli is in Rewa Division.

Politics 
The city is part of the Singrauli Assembly constituency.

References

External links
 

 
Cities and towns in Singrauli district
Cities in Madhya Pradesh